Jewish Motifs International Film Festival is a major Jewish-themed film festival held annually in Warsaw, Poland. The festival has been held every year since 2004.

"The biggest European festival focused on Jewish themes in contemporary cinematography"—according to the Polish Embassy in Bern.

The 15th edition is scheduled to take place in mid-September 2019. Initially the Festival dates were around the anniversary of the Warsaw Ghetto Uprising that is why the precise dates are changing but always in same season (usually in April), since 2016 the festival takes place in late May. In September an exceptional change in dates occurred and Festival was moved for September.

Idea

The festival organizers declare as the aim and objectives:
 raising awareness on subjects related to "Jewish identity and experience throughout history, to the preservation of Jewish culture and tradition as a source of Judeo-Christian civilization – through the art of cinema";
 promote films on Jewish culture "to reach the young audience who is confronted today with the complex problems of our times, such as terrorism, intolerance and hatred";
 "Through artistic expression in the form of films we want to find ways of communicating with all religious, national and cultural communities in order to better know each other and better understand their diverse motives." especially when emphasizing common elements.
 "Present non-profit productions, pioneer or seeking new ways of expression, which do not clash with the universal requirement of truth in artistic work."

Special focus of the festival films is on those produced in the Central-Eastern European region.
Active participation of the audience is specialty of the festival, which organizes direct meetings with the film directors after each screening. Organizers and other experts participate also in the debates and meetings accompanying the shows and post-festival shows, which gives them opportunity for direct interaction. That is why the festival is often described as direct networking meeting and not the festival of red carpets.

The festival partners with other similar Jewish film festivals in Brighton, Vienna and Stockholm.

History
The Festival was organized for the first time in 2004.

According to its director, Mirek Chojecki, it was supposed to be one-time event aiming in presenting tradition of the Jewish cinema, from pre-war Yiddish movies made in Poland up to modern cinema of the 21st century. The festival received such positive attention both from international guests and Polish local audience that at the closing ceremony Chojecki said "see you next year" and this promise he keeps continuing. The "Jewish Motifs" festival became an annual event but only since 2004 as International Film Festival ("Jewish Motifs" International Film Festival).

Traditionally the opening and closing ceremonies are led by Andrzej Wajda (Polish film director) and (Polish-Jewish writer) Józef Hen.

Date 
From the beginning, the festival has taken place regularly in Spring, around the anniversary of the Warsaw Ghetto Uprising in 1943 – which is celebrated as according to the Hebrew (not Julian) calendar.

"Jewish Motifs" Association

In 2004 the group of organizers of first event has founded The Jewish Motifs Association which is a nonprofit organization responsible for organizing further editions of the festival. The Association organizes also post-festival shows and promotes festival movies at the other cultural events in Poland.

Program 
The program consists of the following sections: feature, documentary, experimental, animation, short.

All the films presented, regardless of the competitive or non-competitive category, are eligible for the Audience Award.

Different educational aspect is learning-through-participation: volunteership and internship program offered by the festival. Each year there were from 15 to 80 participants of volunteer and internship program editions.

In 2018, at its 14th edition, the Festival organized a Masterclass workshop in film making led by Israeli document films director and producer Barak Heymann.

Each year the festival is also accompanied by additional events: from kosher cuisine cooking workshops to expert debates on recent topics.

Guest of Honor 

 2006: Claude Lelouch
 2007: Artur Brauner
 2008: Janusz Morgenstern
 2009: Adam Holender
 2010: Edward Żebrowski
 2011: n/a
 2012: Gila Almagor
 2013: Józef Hen
 2014: Andrzej Wajda

Juries 
 2004: Miron Chernyenko, Michael Handelzalts, Kurt Weber, Leo Kantor, Edward Zebrowski.
 2005: Akos Engelmayer, Aryeh Golan-Skornik, Włodek Goldkorn, Sławomir Grunberg, Tadeusz Lubelski.
 2006: Izabela Cywińska, Aleksander Jochwed, Dmitriy Kabakow, Marek Rozenbaum, Witold Stok.
 2007: Alona Frankel, Peter Fudakowski, Peter Mostovoy, Yoram Golan, Aleksander Kwiatkowski.
 2008: Ewa Kuryluk, Tomasz Jastrun, Haim Schreiber, Andrzej Titkow, Aleksander Gutman.
 2009: Andrzej Wolski, Tadeusz Sobolewski, Vita Żelakeviciute, Wanda Kościa-Rostowska, Yossi Wein.
 2010: Irina Rubanova, Petruška Šustrova, Barbara Hollender, Ami Drozd, Ludwik Lewin.
 2011: n/a
 2012: Benjamin Freidenberg, Tatiana Kosinowa, Gabriele Lesser, Lukáš Přibyl, Andrzej Titkow.
 2013: Alexandra Szacka, Danae Elon, Jacek Blawut, Olena Babiy, Rafal Listopad.
 2014: Alon Garbuz, Łukasz Gutt, Maria Zmarz-Koczanowicz, Michał Bregant, Paweł Felis.
 2015: Borys Lankosz, Magdalena Łazarkiewicz, Jacek Petrycki.
 2016: Anna Kazejak, Paweł Łoziński, Łukasz Maciejewski. 
 2017: Joanna Kos-Krauze, fr Andrzej Luter, Anna Zamecka
 2018: Beata Chmiel, Andrzej Jakimowski, Adam Bajerski.
2019: Beata Chmiel, Cezary Harasimowicz, Natalia Koryncka-Gruz.

Award winners
Awards are in several categories:
 Warsaw Phoenix:
 Golden Warsaw Phoenix (Grand Prix)
 Warsaw Phoenix
 for the best feature film,
 for the best documentary film,
 for the best experimental film / best short;
 Audience Award (since 2005);
special awards:
The Ger Mandolin Orchestra Award (awarded in the years 2010 - 2016),
 Antoni Marianowicz Award for the best Polish film (funded by Association of Authors ZAiKS),
 Award funded by the Jewish Community of Warsaw for the best presentation of contemporary Jewish life in film.

Warsaw Phoenix award

Golden Warsaw Phoenix (Grand Prix)

Warsaw Phoenix for the best feature film

Warsaw Phoenix for the best documentary film

Warsaw Phoenix for the best short film

Warsaw Phoenix for the best experimental film

Audience award

See also
Warsaw Jewish Film Festival

References

External links 
 Official website 

Film festivals in Poland
Jewish film festivals in Europe
Recurring events established in 2003
Events in Warsaw
2003 establishments in Poland
Spring (season) events in Poland